Xenofrea is a genus of longhorn beetles of the subfamily Lamiinae, containing the following species:

 Xenofrea albofasciata Galileo & Martins, 2001
 Xenofrea anomala Bates, 1885
 Xenofrea anoreina Tavakilian & Néouze, 2006
 Xenofrea apicalis Melzer, 1931
 Xenofrea aragua Tavakilian & Néouze, 2006
 Xenofrea arcifera Néouze & Tavakilian, 2005
 Xenofrea areolata Bates, 1885
 Xenofrea basitriangularis Néouze & Tavakilian, 2005
 Xenofrea berkovi Néouze & Tavakilian, 2005
 Xenofrea bicincta Tavakilian & Néouze, 2006
 Xenofrea camixaima Galileo & Martins, 2006
 Xenofrea cretacea Néouze & Tavakilian, 2005
 Xenofrea dechambrei Néouze & Tavakilian, 2005
 Xenofrea diagonalis Martins & Galileo, 2010
 Xenofrea durantoni Néouze & Tavakilian, 2005
 Xenofrea enriquezae Tavakilian & Néouze, 2006
 Xenofrea exotica Galileo & Martins, 1999
 Xenofrea favus Tavakilian & Néouze, 2006
 Xenofrea fractanulis Tavakilian & Néouze, 2006
 Xenofrea fulgida Galileo & Martins, 2001
 Xenofrea griseocincta Tavakilian & Néouze, 2006
 Xenofrea guttata Galileo & Martins, 2006
 Xenofrea hovorei Néouze & Tavakilian, 2005
 Xenofrea inermis Néouze & Tavakilian, 2005
 Xenofrea larrei Néouze & Tavakilian, 2005
 Xenofrea lineatipennis Zajciw, 1961
 Xenofrea lupa Tavakilian & Néouze, 2006
 Xenofrea magdalenae Néouze & Tavakilian, 2005
 Xenofrea mariahelenae Tavakilian & Néouze, 2006
 Xenofrea martinsi Tavakilian & Néouze, 2006
 Xenofrea mascara Néouze & Tavakilian, 2005
 Xenofrea monnei Tavakilian & Néouze, 2006
 Xenofrea morvanae Néouze & Tavakilian, 2005
 Xenofrea murina Néouze & Tavakilian, 2005
 Xenofrea nana Galileo & Martins, 2006
 Xenofrea obscura Galileo & Martins, 2006
 Xenofrea ocellata Tavakilian & Néouze, 2006
 Xenofrea picta Tavakilian & Néouze, 2006
 Xenofrea proxima Néouze & Tavakilian, 2005
 Xenofrea pseudomurina Tavakilian & Néouze, 2006
 Xenofrea puma Néouze & Tavakilian, 2005
 Xenofrea punctata Galileo & Martins, 2006
 Xenofrea rogueti Néouze & Tavakilian, 2005
 Xenofrea seabrai Tavakilian & Néouze, 2006
 Xenofrea senecauxi Néouze & Tavakilian, 2005
 Xenofrea soukai Néouze & Tavakilian, 2005
 Xenofrea tavakiliani Dalens, Touroult & Giuglaris, 2009
 Xenofrea trigonalis Bates, 1885
 Xenofrea veronicae Dalens, Touroult & Giuglaris, 2009
 Xenofrea zonata Bates, 1885

References

Lamiinae